The Webster Rubber Company Plant, formerly the Webster Woolen Mill No. 1-1/2, is an historic industrial site on Greene Street in Sabattus, Maine.  Built in 1869 as a textile mill, it was a fixture of the town's economy well into the 20th century, and is good local example of industrial Italianate architecture.  The property was listed on the National Register of Historic Places in 1989.  In 2015, the property was vacant, and it was demolished in 2018.

Description and history
The former Webster Rubber Company plant is located on the west side of the village center of the town, between the western bank of the Sabattus River and Greene Street, the main road leading northwest from the village toward Greene.   The complex includes several connected buildings, dominated by a large three-story brick building with a four-story tower projecting from its center.  The building has vernacular Italianate style, with a flat-roof tower, and windows set in segmented-arch openings.  The broad gabled roof has a corbelled brick cornice.  Additions, principally brick in construction, have been added to this.  The complex also includes three smaller wood frame structures.

The town of Sabbatus was settled in 1774 and incorporated as Webster in 1788.  Its main village, called Sebattis [sic], grew as an industrial village at the mouth of Sabattus Pond.  In the 1970s the town was reincorporated as Sabattus.  The present mill was built in 1869, and was the town's second textile mill, known as "Webster Mill No. 1-1/2".  In 1922 this complex was acquired by the Pine Tree State Rubber Heal Company, and converted to the production of rubber components of shoes.  The mill remained in production until the early 1990s, and has stood vacant since then.  In 2011, the town acquired the property through a tax lien. It was demolished in 2018.

See also
National Register of Historic Places listings in Androscoggin County, Maine

References

Industrial buildings and structures on the National Register of Historic Places in Maine
Buildings and structures in Androscoggin County, Maine
Industrial buildings completed in 1869
National Register of Historic Places in Androscoggin County, Maine
Wool industry
Textile mills in Maine
Demolished buildings and structures in Maine
Buildings and structures demolished in 2018
1869 establishments in Maine
2018 disestablishments in Maine